The megas adnoumiastēs was a mid-level official of the Byzantine Empire during the Palaiologan period.

History and functions
The title means "grand enumerator", and derives from ἀδνούμιον (adnoumion), a term derived from the Latin ad nomen, that designated the roll call of soldiers. The few surviving records that mention the title only contain references to megaloi adnoumiastai, and not to simple holders of the office of adnoumiastēs. Apparently, the office originally entailed maintaining the lists of the soldiers. According to the Book of Offices of Pseudo-Kodinos, written shortly after the mid-14th century, the megas adnoumiastēs was a subaltern official of the megas domestikos, the commander-in-chief of the Byzantine army; he accompanied the latter during inspections, and noted down the soldiers who lacked horses or weapons, so that they could be furnished with them. Rodolphe Guilland suggested that he may have been the successor of the epi tōn basilikōn oplōn ("the one in charge of the imperial arms"), attested under Alexios III Angelos, but admitted the lack of any firm evidence to that end. However, the few existing documentary sources show the holders of the office dealing with the administration of land grants and relevant disputes, in a role similar to that of an apographeus. There could be more than one holders of the office at the same time.

In Pseudo-Kodinos' work, the office occupied the 46th rank in the imperial hierarchy, between the koiastōr and the logothetēs toū stratiōtikou. However, in the earlier list appended to the Hexabiblos, it ranked 50th, between the aktouarios and the koiastōr, while in a 15th-century list (Parisinus gr. 1783) it was 41st, between the epi tōn deēseōn and the koiastōr. According to Pseudo-Kodinos, his uniform was typical of the mid-level courtiers: a gold-embroidered skiadion hat, a plain silk kabbadion, a skaranikon (domed hat) covered in golden and lemon-yellow silk and decorated with gold wire and images of the emperor in front and rear, respectively depicted enthroned and on horseback. His staff of office (dikanikion) was ungilt silver, with a single knob on top, on which stood a dove.

List of known megaloi adnoumiastai

References

Sources 

 
 
 
 
 

Byzantine fiscal offices
Byzantine military offices
Byzantine army
Land management